The Wedding Song is a 1925 American silent drama film directed by Alan Hale and starring Leatrice Joy, Robert Ames, and Charles K. Gerrard. It is based upon the novel of the same name by Ethel Watts Mumford.

Plot
As described in a film magazine review, a young pearl fisher leaves his native island for the first time to go to San  Francisco and dispose of the fortune in South Sea pearls he has gathered. On the steamer bound to San Francisco he meets and falls in love with a woman who is a member of a band of crooks who pose as her relatives. The pearler marries her, but she and her confederates are after the pearls. Following a series of adventures in which the woman is wounded with a gun, she learns that she really loves her husband. She warns him of a plot against his life in time to save him and they are reunited.

Cast

Preservation
A complete print of The Wedding Song is held in the UCLA Film and Television Archive.

References

Bibliography
 Munden, Kenneth White. The American Film Institute Catalog of Motion Pictures Produced in the United States, Part 1. University of California Press, 1997.

External links

Still at silentfilmstillarchive.com

1925 films
1925 drama films
Silent American drama films
Films directed by Alan Hale
American silent feature films
1920s English-language films
American black-and-white films
Producers Distributing Corporation films
Films set in San Francisco
1920s American films